The Constitution Alteration (Terms of Senators) Bill 1984, was the third unsuccessful proposal to alter the Australian Constitution to require that Senate of Australia and House of Representatives elections be constitutionally enforced to occur on the same day. It was put to voters for approval in a referendum held on 1 December 1984.

This was the first referendum in which the electors in the territories were counted towards the national total (but not counted toward any state total) following the 1977 Australian referendum (Referendums) which enabled this.

Background

A proposal for simultaneous elections had been unsuccessful at the referendum in 1974 and substantially the same proposal was again unsuccessful at the referendum in 1977. One of the criticisms of these proposals was that despite the title, the proposal did not require simultaneous elections and the real change which was so that the terms of Senators would be two terms of the House of Representatives. This proposal was similar, however it was expressly named in relation to the terms of senators.

Yes case

The yes case was that there were too many elections and the proposal would decrease the number of elections.

No case

The no case was that the proposal was unnecessary. If the government wanted fewer elections, the House of Representatives could run its full term and the elections would be held at the same time. The proposal was an attempt to undermine the independence of the senate.

Results
An Act to change the terms of senators so that they are no longer of fixed duration and to provide that Senate elections and House of Representatives elections are always held on the same day.

Do you approve this proposed alteration?

Discussion
This was the third unsuccessful referendum that sought to require simultaneous elections of the House of Representatives and the Senate.

References 

Referendum (Terms of Senators)
1984 referendums
Constitutional referendums in Australia
Electoral reform referendums
Electoral reform in Australia